The 2022 Victoria's Voice Foundation 200 was the second stock car race of the 2022 NASCAR Camping World Truck Series and the 26th iteration of the event. The race was held on Friday, March 4, 2022, in North Las Vegas, Nevada at Las Vegas Motor Speedway, a  permanent D-shaped oval racetrack. The race was run over 134 laps. Chandler Smith of Kyle Busch Motorsports would win the race after making a last lap pass on Zane Smith. This was Smith's third career win, and the first of the season. To fill out the podium, Kyle Busch of Kyle Busch Motorsports and Stewart Friesen of Halmar Friesen Racing would finish second and third, respectively. Zane Smith was going to be awarded with second place, but was disqualified after post-race inspection, due to the team having lug nuts that didn't meet the NASCAR specifications.

Background 
Las Vegas Motor Speedway, located in Clark County, Nevada outside the Las Vegas city limits and about 15 miles northeast of the Las Vegas Strip, is a 1,200-acre (490 ha) complex of multiple tracks for motorsports racing. The complex is owned by Speedway Motorsports, Inc., which is headquartered in Charlotte, North Carolina.

Entry list 

 (R) denotes rookie driver.
 (i) denotes driver who is ineligible for series driver points.

 *Driver changed to Matt Jaskol for the race after Jaskol failed to qualify.

Practice 
The only 30-minute practice session was held on Friday, March 4, at 1:30 PM PST.

Qualifying 
Qualifying was held on Friday, March 4, at 2:00 PM PST. Since Las Vegas Motor Speedway is an oval track, the qualifying system used is a single-car, single-lap system with only one round. Whoever sets the fastest time in the round wins the pole.

Race results 
Stage 1 Laps: 30

Stage 2 Laps: 30

Stage 3 Laps: 74

Standings after the race

Drivers' Championship standings

Note: Only the first 10 positions are included for the driver standings.

References 

2022 NASCAR Camping World Truck Series
NASCAR races at Las Vegas Motor Speedway
Victoria's Voice Foundation 200
Victoria's Voice Foundation 200